Flugplatz Hildesheim-Drispenstedt is an airfield located near Hildesheim, Lower Saxony, Germany. It was formerly Tofrek Barracks a British Army installation used during both the Second World War and the Cold War.

The airfield is home to the M'era Luna Festival.

References

External links

 BAOR Locations

Barracks in Germany
Airports in Lower Saxony
Hildesheim